Lesson's saddle-back tamarin (Leontocebus fuscus) is a species of saddle-back tamarin, a type of small monkey from South America.  Lesson's saddle-back tamarin was formerly considered to be a subspecies of the brown-mantled tamarin, L. fuscicollis. Genetic analysis showed it to be more closely related to the black-mantled tamarin than to the brown-mantled tamarin.  Its type locality is in Colombia, in Plaines de Mocoa, Putumayo, between the Rio Putumayo and Rio Caqueta. It also lives in Brazil.

It sometimes associates with Goeldi's marmoset.  The IUCN rates it as least concern from a conservation standpoint.

References

Leontocebus
Taxa named by René Lesson
Mammals described in 1840